Duniya ( The World) is a Hit 1984 Hindi-language action film directed by Ramesh Talwar, starring Dilip Kumar, Ashok Kumar, Rishi Kapoor, Amrita Singh in lead roles. The music was composed by R. D. Burman.

Plot
Mohan Kumar is an honest and conscientious man working as the General Manager of a shipping company owned by his friend, Dinesh. Dinesh is a widower and his daughter, Roma is attached to Mohan Kumar, his wife Sumitra and young son Ravi. Jugal Kishore, Bhandari and Balwant, who work under Mohan Kumar, are into smuggling. When Mohan Kumar learns of their activities, the three men murder Dinesh and deviously frame Mohan Kumar for it. Mohan Kumar is helpless. Unable to prove his innocence in court, he is sentenced to a 14-year jail term. Around the same time his wife gets killed in an accident.

After serving the jail term Mohan Kumar takes help from Puri whose life he had saved in prison, to take revenge on the three villains. Puri has connections with the under-world. While Mohan Kumar is also unable to trace his son Ravi, he comes across Roma who lives with her wayward uncle Jagdish, a mean alcoholic. Unknown to  Mohan Kumar, his lost son Ravi has joined Jugal Kishore and his gang. By a turn of circumstances Ravi meets Roma and saves the life of Mohan Kumar. Mohan Kumar feels an unexplained affection for Ravi. Roma and Ravi fall in love.

When Mohan Kumar plans Bhandari's death, Jugal Kishore and Balwant assign Ravi to kill Mohan Kumar. Unable to do so, Ravi falls off the roof, and is ironically saved by Mohan Kumar. Kabir, one of Puri's henchmen, finds Ravi's gun. Suspicious, he spies on Ravi and finds out his connection to JK and Balwant. Mohan Kumar is enraged.

Balwant tries to kill Mohan Kumar, but fails. Mohan Kumar chases him and hit by a truck, Balwant dies. Enraged by the deaths of Bhandari and Balwant, JK kidnaps Ravi and Roma. having found out that Ravi is Mohan Kumar's son, he demands a huge ransom to release him. In the ensuing fight, Mohan and Ravi collaborate to get JK killed.

Cast

 Ashok Kumar as R. D. Puri
 Dilip Kumar as Mohan Kumar
 Saira Banu as Mrs. Sumitra Kumar
 Rishi Kapoor as Ravi Kumar
 Amrita Singh as Roma Verma
 Prem Chopra as Prakash Chandra Bhandari
 Amrish Puri as Balwant Singh Kalra
 Pran as Jugal Kishore Ahuja "J. K."
 Pradeep Kumar as Dinesh Verma
 Kulbhushan Kharbanda as Teja
 Om Puri as Vasudev
 Sulabha Deshpande as Mary  
 Dhumal as Pascal
 Satyen Kappu as Jagdish
 Mac Mohan as Kabir
 Javed Khan Amrohi as Tony
 Arvind Deshpande as Albert Pinto
 Anjan Srivastav as Stranger 
 Manik Irani as Manik

Trivia

The telephone sequence from the movie - where the hero repeatedly calls a landline number but disconnects the call giving a feel of wrong connection but does not disconnect it finally when the villains are into discussion - is based on a similar sequence from the 1977 Kannada movie Olavu Geluvu.

Soundtrack
Lyrics: Javed Akhtar

References

External links 
 

1984 films
1980s Hindi-language films
Films scored by R. D. Burman
Films directed by Ramesh Talwar